John Harley Lang (27 October 19273 June 2012) was an Anglican priest in the second half of the 20th century.

Lang was educated at Merchant Taylors' and trained for the priesthood at King's College London. After National Service with the 12th Royal Lancers he was ordained in 1952. Following a curacy at the large city parish of St Mary's, Portsea, Portsmouth he was Priest Vicar of Southwark Cathedral then Chaplain of Emmanuel College, Cambridge. From 1963 until 1980 he worked in religious broadcasting for the BBC. Finally he was Dean of Lichfield for 13 years. He died on 3 June 2012.

References

1927 births
People educated at Merchant Taylors' School, Northwood
Alumni of the Theological Department of King's College London
BBC executives
Deans of Lichfield
2012 deaths